Akurdi is a village in Mawal taluka, in Pune district, in the state of Maharashtra, India.It encompasses an area of .

Administration
The village is administrated by a sarpanch, an elected representative who leads a gram panchayat. At the time of the 2011 Census of India, the gram panchayat governed three villages and was based at Ambi.

Demographics
At the 2011 census, the village comprised 40 households. The population of 184 was split between 99 males and 85 females.

See also
List of villages in Mawal taluka

References

Villages in Mawal taluka